1,000 Days, 1,000 Songs (originally called 30 Days, 30 Songs, then 30 Days, 50 Songs) is a musical project launched on October 10, 2016, by Dave Eggers which was originally supposed to release one song per day from then until November 8, 2016, which is Election Day in the United States.  Each of the songs is performed by one of 40 musicians or projects, and the songs all advocate against voting for Donald Trump in the 2016 U.S. presidential election. Eggers worked on the project with Jordan Kurland, the owner of Zeitgeist Artist Management. The two of them previously worked on two similar election-related projects, including the "90 Days, 90 Reasons" campaign in 2012. Eggers originally got the idea for the project when attending a Trump rally in Sacramento, California in June 2016.   The first song in the project was "Million Dollar Loan" by Death Cab for Cutie.

Songs

See also

Donald Trump in music

References

External links

2010s in American music
2016 beginnings
2016 United States presidential election in popular culture
Donald Trump 2016 presidential campaign
Donald Trump-related lists
Lists of songs
Musical advocacy groups
Music and politics
Songs about Donald Trump